The Slocum Revolver in cal. 32 rimfire was an attempt to circumvent the Rollin White patent. This 5-shot pocket revolver was made 1864 to 1864 by the Brooklyn Arms Co, Brooklyn, New York. Total quantity is estimated to have been more than 10,000 units.

History 
The Slocum, a unique design, was patented on January 27. 1863 (Patent No. 37 551). Later, on April 14, 1863, a patent covering a slight modification of the cartridge ejector system (Patent No. 38 204) and granted to Frank P. Slocum. This circumvented the Rollin White “bored through cylinder” patent which belonged to Smith & Wesson.
 
Like the Smith & Wesson Model 1 1/2 and the Smith & Wesson Model No. 2 Army-revolvers, many caliber .32 rimfire Slocum revolvers were used as a Backup-weapon for self-defence by soldiers and officers in the American Civil War.

Technical details 
The Slocum single-action revolvers, chambered for calibre .32 rimfire long and short cartridges were made with engraved brass frames, originally silver plated, blued 3 inch round or octagonal barrels and 2-piece rose-wood grips. 
The cylinder of the revolver was designed with five individual chambers in the form of sliding tubes (length of the chambers 1.24 inch) within the cutouts of the cylinder. For removing spent cartridge cases and reloading, the chambers slide forward one at a time over an ejector-rod at the front of the cylinder, fixed on the right side parallel to the barrel.

References 

Revolvers of the United States
Early revolvers
Single-action revolvers
Guns of the American West